Kisah 9 Wali is an Indonesian historical-drama TV series. This TV series was first aired of on June 28, 2014, the first day of Ramadan. This TV series will only run when Ramadan. This TV series tells about the story of 9 Wali spreading Islam on Java Island.

Cast 
 Natalia Shasanti as Anjani
 Boy Hamzah as Sunan Giri
 Donny Alamsyah as Sunan Kalijaga
 Reza Pahlevi as Sunan Kudus
 David Chalik as Sunan Gresik
 Mario Irwinsyah as Sunan Gunung Jati
 Tegar Satrya as Sunan Ampel
 Shandy Syarif as Sunan Drajat
 Ali Zainal as Sunan Bonang
 Dimas Seto as Sunan Muria
 Alex Abbad as Syekh Siti Jenar
 Dave Swatt
 Rosnita Putri
 Winda Khair
 Claudia Inda Lamanna

External links

Indonesian drama television series
2014 Indonesian television series debuts
2010s Indonesian television series